Grevillea drummondii, commonly known as Drummond's grevillea, is a species of flowering plant in the family Proteaceae and is endemic to the south-west of Western Australia. It is a low, spreading to erect shrub with narrowly elliptic to narrowly egg-shaped leaves with the narrower end towards the base, and dense groups of cream-coloured flowers that turn pink or red as they age.

Description
Both surfaces of the leaves usually have a few shaggy hairs.

Taxonomy
Grevillea drummondii was first formally described in 1845 by Carl Meissner in Johann Georg Christian Lehmann's Plantae Preissianae from specimens collected by James Drummond near the Swan River. The specific epithet (drummondii) honours the collector of the type specimens.

Distribution and habitat
This grevillea grows in woodland and shrubland on gravelly soil between Bindoon and Bolgart in the Avon Wheatbelt, Geraldton Sandplains, Jarrah Forest and Swan Coastal Plain biogeographic regions of south-western Western Australia.

Conservation status 
Drummond's grevillea is classified as "Priority Four" by the Government of Western Australia Department of Biodiversity, Conservation and Attractions, meaning that it is rare or near threatened.

References

drummondii
Endemic flora of Western Australia
Eudicots of Western Australia
Proteales of Australia
Taxa named by Carl Meissner
Plants described in 1845